Shawforth railway station served Shawforth near Bacup, Rossendale, Lancashire, England, from 1881 until closure in 1947.

References

 

Disused railway stations in the Borough of Rossendale
Former Lancashire and Yorkshire Railway stations
Railway stations in Great Britain opened in 1881
Railway stations in Great Britain closed in 1947
1881 establishments in England